Al-Jannat is a small town in Amran District of 'Amran Governorate, Yemen. It is located about 2.5km from 'Amran, the governorate capital, at the edge of the al-Bawn plain. Overlooking the town is the height called Jabal al-Jannat, where the historic fort called Qasr al-Jannat is located.

History 
During the middle ages, al-Jannat was more significant than 'Amran due to its strategic fortified location. Whereas 'Amran is largely absent from historical texts during this period, al-Jannat appears frequently in accounts such as the Ghayat al-amani of Yahya ibn al-Husayn and the Kitab al-Simt of Muhammad ibn Hatim al-Yami al-Hamdani, especially in the 13th century.

References 

Populated places in 'Amran Governorate